A soliton is a type of self-reinforcing solitary wave.

Soliton may also refer to:

 Soliton (optics), an optical field that does not change during propagation because of a balance between nonlinear and linear effects
 Soliton (topology), a solution of a system of partial differential equations or of a quantum field theory homotopically distinct from the vacuum solution
 Soliton distribution, a type of discrete probability distribution that arises in the theory of erasure correcting codes
 Soliton Incorporated, company
 Soliton model, neurological model